University of Benin Teaching Hospital (UBTH) is a premier and multi-specialty healthcare service provider in West Africa. The hospital is located in Ugbowo, Benin City and was established on May 12, 1973 following the enactment of an edict (number 12) of the Nigeria National Health Act.

As the sixth of the 1st generation Teaching Hospitals in Nigeria, its establishment was to complement her sister institution, University of Benin, and to provide secondary and tertiary care to the then Mid-western Region (now Edo and Delta State) and its environs. It provides facilities for the training of a high- and middle-level workforce for the health industry. UBTH spearheads research opportunities for lecturers in the University and others who study the burden of economic morbidity as well as other research issues.

Through the Community Health Centres in Ogbona and Udo, and the General Practice Clinic that came on stream later, UBTH equally provides some avenues for primary health care to the immediate communities.
University of Benin Teaching Hospital offers an internship training for medical professionals from various medical fields such as Medicine, Pharmacy, Physiotherapy, Ophthalmology, Medical Laboratory scientist, Nursing, Radiography, Dentistry, Nutrition and Dietetics, amongst other professions

History 

The concept of the University of Benin Teaching Hospital originated in 1969 with Colonel Samuel O. Ogbemudia, the then Governor of the Midwestern State of Nigeria, and Prof. Tiamiyu Belo-Osagie. The desire to establish a befitting medical center in the Midwestern Region of Nigeria was developed after the governor paid private visits to the Island Maternity Hospital, Lagos and the Lagos University Teaching Hospital.

A few months later, an Advisory Committee for the Midwestern Medical Centre was set up with Prof. H. Oritsejolomi Thomas as Chairman. Other members of the committee included Prof. Tiamiyu Belo-Osagie, Professor Alex Eyimofo Boyo, and Mr. O. I. Afe, Secretary to the Midwestern Military Government and Head of Service.

Within the same year, the construction of the hospital was awarded by the committee to Costain (Nigeria) Limited and was funded collaboratively by both the Government of the Midwestern Region and the Federal Government of Nigeria. Other prominent individuals who championed the establishment of the hospital from construction to opening. were: Dr. Irene E. B. Ighodaro, Professor Glyn O. Philips, Dr. A. E. Ikomi, Dr F.O. Esiri Infirmary, and Mr. J. O. Iluebbey.

The "Midwest Medical Centre" was renamed "University of Benin Teaching Hospital" in a budget speech by Colonel Samuel O. Ogbemudia in April 1972.

The University of Benin Teaching Hospital is led by Professor Darlington E. Obaseki.

Notable people 

 Osagie Emmanuel Ehanire
 Darlington E. Obaseki Professor of Histopathology and the 6th Chief Medical Director of the Hospital.

References 

Teaching hospitals in Nigeria
1973 establishments in Nigeria
Benin City